

Christian democratic parties are political parties that seek to apply Christian principles to public policy. The underlying Christian democracy movement emerged in 19th-century Europe, largely under the influence of Catholic social teaching and Neo-Calvinist theology. Christian democracy continues to be influential in Europe and Latin America, though in a number of countries its Christian ethos has been diluted by secularisation. In practice, Christian democracy is often considered centre-right on cultural, social and moral issues, but centre-left "with respect to economic and labor issues, civil rights, and foreign policy" as well as the environment, generally supporting a social market economy. Christian democracy can be seen as either conservative, centrist, or liberal / left of, right of, or center of the mainstream political parties depending on the social and political atmosphere of a given country and the positions held by individual Christian democratic parties. In Europe, where their opponents have traditionally been secularist socialists, Christian democratic parties are moderately conservative overall, whereas in the very different cultural and political environment of Latin America they tend to lean to the left. It is the dominant centre-right political movement in Europe, but by contrast, Christian democratic parties in Latin America tend to be left-leaning. Christian democracy includes elements common to several other political ideologies, including conservatism, liberalism, and social democracy. In the United States, Christian democratic parties of Europe and Latin America, deemed conservative and liberal respectively in their geopolitical regions, are both generally regarded as farther left-wing of the mainstream.

Alphabetical list by country

A

 Albanian Christian Democratic Movement
 Christian Democratic Party of Albania

 Christian Democratic Party

 Christian-Democratic Rebirth Party
 Christian Democratic Union of Armenia
 National Christian Party

 Aruban People's Party

 Christian Democratic Party
 Democratic Labour Party 

 Austrian People's Party

B

 Belarusian Christian Democracy
 BPF Party

 Christian Democratic and Flemish 
 Humanist Democratic Centre
 Christian Social Party
 ProDG
Citizens' Movement for Change

 Christian Democratic Party

 Croatian Democratic Union 1990
 Croatian Democratic Union of Bosnia and Herzegovina
 Croatian Christian Democrats

 Brazilian Republican Party
 Christian Democracy
 Christian Democracy Union of Brazil
 Christian Labour Party
 Democrats (Brazil) 
 Social Christian Party

 Union of Democratic Forces
 Christ Democratic Party of Bulgaria
 Reformist Bloc

 Christian Democratic Party

C

 Christian Heritage Party of Canada

 Movement for Democracy
União Caboverdeana Independente e Democratica (Cape Verdean Union for an Independent Democracy) – UCID

 Christian Democratic Party

 Christian National Party
 Christians for Community
 Christian Social Democratic Party

 Christian Democratic Party
 Reform Party
 Social Christian Unity Party
 Social Christian Republican Party
 Christian Democratic Alliance

 Croatian Democratic Union
 Croatian Peasant Party
 Croatian Christian Democratic Party

 Christian Democratic Party of Cuba
 Christian Liberation Movement

 National People's Party

 Democratic Rally

 Christian and Democratic Union – Czechoslovak People's Party

D

 Christian Democratic Party (Democratic Republic of the Congo) 
 Convention of Christian Democrats 
 Democratic Social Christian Party 
 Federalist Christian Democracy – Convention of Federalists for Christian Democracy 
 Movement for the Liberation of the Congo 

 Christian Democrats

 Christian Democratic Union
 Christian Democratic Party
 Social Christian Reformist Party

E

 Christian Democratic Party
 Christian Democratic Union of Timor

 Christian Democratic Party (Ecuador)
Social Christian Party

 Christian Democratic Party (Egypt), a Coptic party in Egypt founded in the 1950s. 

 Christian Democratic Party

 Pro Patria and Res Publica Union
 Party of Estonian Christian Democrats

 European Christian Political Movement
 European People's Party

F

 Centre Party

 Christian Democrats

 The Republicans
 Christian Democratic Party

G

 Christian-Democratic Movement
 Alliance of Patriots of Georgia

 Christian Democratic Union of Germany 
 Christian Social Union in Bavaria 
 Centre Party 
 Family Party of Germany
 Alliance C – Christians for Germany

 New Gibraltar Democracy

 Christian Democratic Party of the Overthrow 
 New Democracy

H

 Christian Democratic Party of Honduras

 Christian Democratic People's Party

I

 Christian Democratic Party Indonesia

 Fine Gael
 Fianna Fáil

 Chaldean Democratic Party

 Forza Italia
 Popular Alternative
 Populars for Italy
 Solidary Democracy
 South Tyrolean People's Party
 Union of the Centre

K

 Albanian Christian Democratic Party of Kosovo

L

 Fatherland Union

Lithuanian Christian Democrats Party
Homeland Union – Lithuanian Christian Democrats
 Electoral Action of Poles in Lithuania

 Kataeb Party
 Lebanese Forces

 Christian Social People's Party

M

 Nationalist Party

 National Action Party

 Christian-Democratic People's Party

N

 Christian Democratic Appeal
 Christian Union

Social Christian Party

 VMRO–DPMNE
 VMRO – People's Party

 Christian People's Party

P

 People's Party

 Christian Democratic Party

 Christian Democratic Party

 Christian People's Party
Democratic Party "We are Peru"

 Lakas–CMD (Lakas-Christian Muslim Democrats)
 Bangon Pilipinas Party
 Centrist Democratic Party of the Philippines

Agreement
Christian Democracy of the 3rd Polish Republic
 Civic Platform
Law and Justice
 Polish People's Party

 Democratic and Social Centre – People's Party

R

 Christian-Democratic National Peasants' Party
 National Liberal Party
 Force of the Right
 People's Movement Party

 Christian Democratic Party of Russia

 Christian Democratic Party

S

 Sammarinese Christian Democratic Party
Union for the Republic

 United Workers Party

Christian Democratic Front

 Christian Democratic Party of Serbia
 Democratic Party of Serbia

 St. Maarten Christian Party

 Christian Democratic Movement
 Alliance

 New Slovenia – Christian Democrats
 Slovenian People's Party

 African Christian Democratic Party
Christian Democratic Party
United Christian Democratic Party

 People's Party
 Basque Nationalist Party
 Democrats of Catalonia

 Christian Democrats

 Christian Democratic People's Party of Switzerland
 Christian Social Party of Obwalden
 Evangelical People's Party of Switzerland
 The Centre (political party)

U

 Batkivshchyna
European Solidarity

Conservatives
 Christian Peoples Alliance

 American Solidarity Party

 National Party
 Christian Democratic Party of Uruguay

V

 Project Venezuela
 Political Electoral Independent Organization Committee (COPEI)
 National Convergence

Other entities
 Global – Centrist Democrat Internationalheadquartered in Brussels
 European Union – European People's PartyCentrist Democratic regional in Europe; and the largest group in European ParliamentEuropean Christian Political Movement 
 Americas – Christian Democrat Organization of AmericaCentrist Democratic regional in the Americas, North and South

Related philosophies
 Catholic social teaching
 Communitarianism
 Distributism
 Neo-Calvinism
 Social conservatism
 Social market economy
 Political Catholicism
 Christian politics
 Christian Zionism
 Liberal Conservatism
 Abolitionism
 New World Order

Indices
 List of generic names of political parties
 List of political parties by country

See also

 Christian left
 Christian right
 Communitarianism

Notes

References

 
Christian democrat
Conservatism-related lists